The Triple Bridge (in older sources also Tromostje) is a group of three bridges across the Ljubljanica River. It connects Ljubljana's historical medieval town on one bank and the modern city of Ljubljana, the capital of Slovenia, on the other.

Design
The central bridge is partly built from Glinica limestone. Other parts are built from concrete. The balustrades with 642 balusters are made of concrete.  The platform is paved with granite blocks laid in 2010. Previously, it was paved with asphalt.

History

There is mention of a wooden bridge in this location from 1280. It was at first called the Old Bridge and later the Lower Bridge, in contrast to the Upper Bridge that was built in the location of the nowadays Cobblers' Bridge in the same century. It was also named the Špital Bridge after the nearby poorhouse, which was established in the early 14th century. It was built anew in 1657 after a fire.

In 1842, the Lower Bridge was replaced by a new bridge designed by Giovanni Picco, an Italian architect from Villach, and named Franz's Bridge, in honor of Archduke Franz Karl of Austria. It also became known as the Franciscan Bridge. This bridge, opened on 25 September 1842, had two arches and a metal fence. The essentials of the bridge have been preserved until today, which is evidenced by the inscribed dedication to the archduke above its central pier, reading in Latin "", which means "To Archduke Franz Karl in 1842 by the Town."

In order to prevent the 1842 stone arch bridge from being a bottleneck, the architect Jože Plečnik designed in 1929 the extension of the bridge with two footbridges at a slight angle on each side of it. In collaboration with his student Ciril Tavčar, who drew the plans, he published the proposal in the same year in the journal Ljubljanski zvon. Construction started in 1931 and continued until spring 1932. The bridge was opened for traffic in April 1932.

The bridge was renovated in 1992. Since 2007, all the three bridges have been part of the Ljubljana pedestrian-only zone.

Depictions
 A model of the bridge is displayed at Mini-Europe in Brussels.
 On 23 January 2012, celebrating the 140th anniversary of Jože Plečnik's birth, a picture of the Triple Bridge was featured as an official Google logo (Doodle) adaptation in Slovenia.

See also
Other bridges designed by Plečnik:
 Butchers' Bridge
 Cobblers' Bridge
 Rooster Bridge
 Ljubljanica Sluice Gate
 Trnovo Bridge

References

External links

 44 international travelers sharing their experience of Triple Bridge  on VirtualTurist.com
 Interactive panoramic virtual view of the Triple Bridge by the Burger.si
 Youtube video on the Triple Bridge by InYourPocket travel guide

Bridges in Ljubljana
Bridges completed in 1932
Jože Plečnik buildings
Bridges over the Ljubljanica
Center District, Ljubljana
Arch bridges in Slovenia
Pedestrian bridges in Slovenia
Art Nouveau architecture in Ljubljana
Art Nouveau bridges
20th-century architecture in Slovenia